Luís Maria da Costa de Freitas Branco (12 October 1890 – 27 November 1955) was a Portuguese composer, musicologist, and professor of music who played a pre-eminent part in the development of Portuguese music in the first half of the 20th century.

Life
Luis de Freitas Branco was born in Lisbon into an aristocratic family who for centuries had had close ties to the royal family in Portugal. He had a cosmopolitan education, studied piano and violin beginning in childhood and began composing at a precocious age. He studied music in Berlin and Paris, where he worked with Engelbert Humperdinck and other composers. He returned to Portugal and became professor of composition starting in 1916 at the Lisbon Conservatory of Music, where he became a leading force in restructuring musical education. There he taught, among many others, Joly Braga Santos.

During the 1930s he increasingly encountered political difficulties with the authorities and was finally forced into retirement from his official duties in 1939. He continued to compose, however, and to pursue his research into Portuguese early music, publishing several books and numerous articles. His book about the musical works of King John IV of Portugal (1603–1656), an accomplished composer who introduced new music to Portugal, was published only in the year after Branco's death.

He was the brother of the Portuguese conductor Pedro de Freitas Branco.

He married Estela Diniz de Ávila e Sousa, born on 18 August 1892, daughter of João Deodato de Ávila e Sousa (b. São Jorge Island, Velas, 10 November 1861) and wife Margarida Diniz; the couple had no children.

Branco had an illegitimate son by Maria Clara Dambert Filgueiras, of French descent:
 João de Freitas Branco (Lisbon, 10 January 1922 – 17 November 1989, Caxias, Lisbon), married first to Maria Helena von Hoffmann de Barros de Abreu, daughter of António de Barros de Abreu, a lawyer, and wife German Marie Anna Helena von Hoffmann, three children; married again in 1954, to Maria Isabel do Nascimento, one son.

Branco died in Lisbon, aged 65.

Works
Symphony No. 1 (1924)
Symphony No. 2 (1926)
Symphony No. 3 (1944)
Symphony No. 4 (1952)
Scherzo Fantastique (1907)
Antero de Quental – symphonic poem (1908), named after the poet Antero de Quental (1842–1891)
Paraísos Artificiais (Artificial Paradises) – symphonic poem (1910)
Tentações de S. Frei Gil (St. Friar Gil's Temptations) (1911)
Vathek (1913)
Violin Concerto (1916)
Alentejo Suite No. 1 (1919)
Alentejo Suite No. 2 (1927)
Solemnia Verba – symphonic poem (1951)

Selected discography
 Madrigais Camonianos. Three series with total 28 madrigals on texts by Luís de Camões. , conducted by Fernando Eldoro. PortugalSom PS 5010, 2008.

Use of his music in film
Douro, Faina Fluvial (1931) by Manoel de Oliveira
 Wild Cattle (1934)
Mistérios de Lisboa (2010) by Raúl Ruiz

References

Sources

External links

Short biography, Naxos Records
Biography, audio samples, catalogue

1890 births
1955 deaths
20th-century classical composers
Portuguese classical composers
People from Lisbon
Pupils of Engelbert Humperdinck
Portuguese male classical composers
20th-century male musicians